Machen Rugby Football Club is a Welsh rugby union club based in Machen, near the city of Newport.  Machen RFC is a member of the Welsh Rugby Union and is a feeder club for the Dragons.

Rugby football was played in Machen from the early 1870s, but Machen RFC can be placed as playing as a club from the early 1880s. One of the club's earliest and most notable players was Frank Purdon, who would later go on to play from Newport and Wales.

The club also has two notable local rivalries with Risca and Bedwas.

Former notable players
Bill Everson
Frank Purdon (4 caps)
Mel Rosser

References

Welsh rugby union teams